For the People is a political party in Georgia founded by former Deputy Minister of Defence Anna Dolidze. The presentation of the party was held on May 22, 2021.

History
On May 21, 2020, Anna Dolidze founded the civil movement "For the People". According to her, the goal of the movement was to create a new political reality with "clean hands", which would end bipolar system dominated by the Georgian Dream and the United National Movement. A year later, on May 22, 2022, she founded the party "For the People", whose cornerstone is social justice. The party has published a manifesto.

2021 local government elections
In the 2021 local government elections, party chairperson Anna Dolidze was presented as a candidate for Tbilisi mayor and received 4.56% (21,935) of the votes in the conditions of strengthened bipolarity and took the fourth place. 

Party "For the People" was represented in all ten majority districts of Tbilisi, and in seven municipalities across the region. These are: Mestia, Ozurgeti, Chkhorotsku, Kazbegi, Kutaisi, Rustavi, Oni.

The party received 14,988 votes throughout the country and won one mandate each in Tbilisi and Kazbegi municipalities. Tbilisi - Nino Tsuladze; Kazbegi - Shengeli Avsajanishvili. 

In the local government elections of 2021, one vote for the party cost the least - 2.01 GEL compared to other parties. In the reporting period, the party spent a total of 30,186 GEL, of which 10,816 were advertising expenses. The party received 29,572 as revenue. In the elections, Anna Dolidze's party received 14,988 votes, therefore, one vote cost the party 2.01 GEL.

Electoral results

Local elections

Tbilisi city assembly election results

External links
Party Official site

References

Political parties in Georgia (country)
Pro-European political parties in Georgia (country)
Political parties established in 2021